Ivana Primorac (born in Zagreb in 1965) is a Croatian make-up artist and hairstylist. She began her career working in television after a job working for the BBC. Primorac later moved on to working in feature films, including Atonement, Sweeney Todd and The Reader. Primorac has earned various award nominations for her work.

Career
Primorac started working as a hair and make-up artist in television. She wanted to work at the BBC, as she believed their training was the best and eventually got a job with the BBC-trained designers as a trainee. Primorac moved on to working in feature films and she has worked on many films since the nineties, including Elizabeth, Gladiator, The Hours, Atonement, Sweeney Todd and The Reader. While working on the 2000 film, Billy Elliot, Primorac graduated to hair and make-up.

In 2009, Primorac donated her time to a television public service announcement promoting awareness of domestic violence. The announcement, titled Cut, starred actress Keira Knightley. Commenting on her rise to prominence within the film industry, Primorac said "You can't become a makeup artist overnight."

Recognition
Primorac has been nominated for five BAFTA awards for her work. Primorac has attended the Academy Award's "bake-off" sessions for The Hours, Cold Mountain and Sweeney Todd.

Filmography

Awards

References

External links
 

Living people
Best Makeup BAFTA Award winners
British make-up artists
1965 births